Mahendra Ray Yadav is a Nepali politician and a member of the House of Representatives of the federal parliament of Nepal. He is the current central committee chairman of Socialist Party of Nepal.

He was elected under the first-past-the-post system from Sarlahi-2 constituency, representing Rastriya Janata Party Nepal. In the 2013 Nepalese Constituent Assembly election, he defeated his nearest rival, Rajendra Mahato of Sadbhawana Party, acquiring 11,534 votes to the latter's  8,790.

Political life 
As of March 2017, he was leading Tarai Madhes Sadbhawana Party in the legislature parliament as party chairman. Following the formation of Rastriya Janata Party Nepal, he was one of the six members of the party presidium. He became the coordinator of the chairman council on 20 January 2019, taking over from Rajendra Mahato.

Electoral history

2017 legislative elections

2013 Constituent Assembly election

1999 legislative elections

1994 legislative elections

See also
 Socialist Party of Nepal

References

Living people
Rastriya Janata Party Nepal politicians
Madhesi people
Place of birth missing (living people)
21st-century Nepalese people
Nepal MPs 2017–2022
Nepal MPs 1999–2002
Nepal MPs 1994–1999
Government ministers of Nepal
Members of the 1st Nepalese Constituent Assembly
Members of the 2nd Nepalese Constituent Assembly
Communist Party of Nepal (Unified Marxist–Leninist) politicians
Terai Madhesh Loktantrik Party politicians
Socialist Party of Nepal politicians
1954 births
Nepal MPs 2022–present